Lakewood Township is located in Shelby County, Illinois. As of the 2010 census, its population was 439 and it contained 191 housing units.

Geography

Demographics

The 2016 population estimate was 427 individuals.

References

External links
City-data.com
Illinois State Archives

Townships in Shelby County, Illinois
Townships in Illinois